The Atlantic Central Football Conference (ACFC) was a college athletic conference which competed in football only in the NCAA Division III. Its member teams were located in Delaware, Maryland and Virginia. The conference disbanded following the 2010 season.

Member schools

Final member schools

* - The Apprentice School is not a college or university, and is not associated with either the NCAA or the NAIA.  However, ever since the school was founded in 1919 it has fielded athletic teams (including football) that compete against small college NCAA/NAIA teams.

Other member schools

Championship teams

Individual records
Note: ACFC records are incomplete. Various sources have been used to attempt to complete the records, including individual schools' websites.

Offensive

Scoring
Game: 30 - DeNelle Hale, Frostburg vs. Apprentice, 10/27/01
and Leroy Satchell, Salisbury vs. Buffalo State, 10/15/05

Season: 11.3 ppg (102 pts) - Fred Edwards, Wesley, 2001

Scoring (TDs)
Game: 5 - DeNelle Hale, Frostburg vs. Apprentice, 10/27/01
and Leroy Satchell, Salisbury vs. Buffalo State, 10/15/05

Season: 19 Fred Edwards, Wesley, 2001

Rushing
Game: 282 - Kevin Nelson, Wesley vs. Chowan, 11/6/04

Yards/Game: 157.9 - Kevin Nelson, Wesley, 2004

Season: 1579 yds - Kevin Nelson, Wesley, 2004

Rushing Attempts

Game: 39 - Brandon Walker, Frostburg State vs. Methodist, 11/14/98

Season: 273, Brandon Walker, Frostburg State, 1998

Rushing TDs
Game: 5 - DeNelle Hale, Frostburg vs. Apprentice, 10/27/01 
and Leroy Satchell, Salisbury vs. Buffalo State, 10/15/05

Season: 19 - Fred Edwards, Wesley, 2001

Passing Yds.
Game: 476 - Jason Visconti, Wesley vs. Rowan, 9/8/01

Yards/Game: 333.6 - Jason Visconti, Wesley, 2001

Season: 3710 yds - Chris Warrick, Wesley, 2005

Passing Attempts
Game: 65 - Grant Burrough, Frostburg State vs. Catholic, 10/19/02

Season: 421 - Grant Burrough, Frostburg State, 2002 and 
Chris Warrick, Wesley, 2005

Career: 1,334 - Chris Warrick, Wesley, 2003–06

Passing Completions
Game: 35 - Grant Burrough, Frostburg State vs. Catholic, 10/19/02 and 
Grant Burrough, Frostburg State vs. Waynesburg, 11/9/02

Season: 239 - Chris Warrick, Wesley, 2005

Career: 737 - Chris Warrick, Wesley, 2003–06

Pass Efficiency Rating
Season: 163.7 - Jason Visconti, Wesley, 2001

Passing TD
Game: 6 - Jason Visconti, Wesley vs. Apprentice, 10/14/00 
Jason Visconti, Wesley vs. Apprentice, 10/13/01 
Jason Visconti, Wesley vs. Chowan, 11/3/01 

Season: 37 - Jason Visconti, Wesley, 2001 and 
Chris Warrick, Wesley, 2005

Career: 100 - Chris Warrick, Wesley, 2003–06

Total Offense
Game: 464 yds - Jason Visconti, Wesley vs. Rowan, 9/8/01

Yards/Game: 321.5 - Jason Visconti, Wesley, 2001

Season: 3655 yds - Chris Warrick, Wesley, 2005

Receptions
Game: 16 - Greg Cooper, Frostburg State vs. Brockport State, 10/16/99

Season: 77 - Marcus Lee, Wesley, 2005

Season Average: 6.27 - Greg Cooper, Frostburg State, 1999

Receiving Yards
Game: 248 - Anthony Young, Frostburg State vs. Apprentice, 11/6/10
Season: 1304 - Mike Clarke, Wesley, 2006

Season Average: 100.4 - William Ray, Methodist, 1998

Receiving TDs
Game: 4 - Larry Beavers, Wesley vs. Mary Hardin-Baylor, 11/26/05 and 
Mike Clarke, Wesley vs. Dickinson, 11/18/06

Season: 20 - Ellis Krout, Wesley, 2009

All-Purpose Yards
Game: 282 - Kevin Nelson, Wesley vs. Chowan, 11/6/04

Yards per Game: 189.2 - Brian Wise, SUNY Brockport, 2005

Season: 1892 - Brian Wise, SUNY Brockport, 2005

Longest Rushing Play
99 yds - Reggie Boyce, Salisbury vs. Chowan, 10/7/00

Longest Pass Play
93 yds - Grant Burrough to Anthony Long, Frostburg State vs. Waynesburg, 11/9/02

Passes Intercepted
Game: 6 - Jason Tipton, Apprentice vs. Salisbury, 10/20/01

Season: 17 - Chris Warrick, Wesley, 2005

Defensive

Interceptions
Game: 3 - many people

Season: 8 - Antwain Haskins, Chowan, 1998

Interceptions Per Game
Season: 0.80 - Antwain Haskins, Chowan, 1998

Interception Return Yards
Game: 100 - Duane Manson, Wesley vs. Stonehill, 11/7/98

Season: 204 - Duane Manson, Wesley, 1998

Longest Interception Return:
100 yds - Duane Manson, Wesley vs. Stonehill, 11/7/98

Sacks
Game: 5 - Tone Dancy, Ferrum at Chowan 10/14/00

Season: 14 Tone Dancy, Ferrum, 2000

Special teams

Scoring (Kicking) Season
Game: 16 pts - Jarred Boehner, Frostburg State vs. Wesley, 10/11/03 (4-4 PAT, 4-4 FG)

Season: 7.1 ppg (99 pts/14 gms ) - Christian Cattanea, Wesley, 2006

Field Goal Attempts
Game: 5 - Chris Carlton, Wesley vs. Frostburg State, 10/9/04
and Mark Sedlock, Frostburg State vs. Westminster, 10/29/05
Season: 18 - Brock Boland, Salisbury, 2004
and Mark Sedlock, Frostburg State, 2005

Field Goals
Game: 4 - Jarred Boehner, Frostburg State at Wesley, 10/11/03

Season: 1.44 FG/gm - Paul Jacko, Salisbury, 2001

Field Goal Pct.
Season: 88.9 (8-9) - Joe Cavaleri, Ferrum, 2000

Longest Field Goal
49 yds - Adam Lanctot, SUNY Brockport vs. College of New Jersey, 11/5/05

PAT Made
Game: 10 - Brock Boland, Salisbury vs. Apprentice, 10/1/05

Season: 64 - Chris Carlton, Wesley, 2005

PAT Attempts
Game: 10 - Brock Boland, Salisbury vs. Apprentice, 10/1/05

Season: 70 - Chris Carlton, Wesley, 2005

PAT Kicking Pct. (2 att/G)
Game: 100% many times, most 10-10 by Brock Boland, Salisbury vs. Apprentice, 10/1/05

Season: 95.8 (23-24) - Mark Sedlock, Frostburg State, 2005 and Adam Lanctot, SUNY Brockport, 2005

Punts
Game: 11 - Matt Henne, Chowan vs. Randolph-Macon, 9/26/98
11 - Richard Harr, Ferrum vs. Emory & Henry, 10/31/98

Season: 71 - Tim Loss, Frostburg State, 2000

Punting Yards
Game: 467 - Richard Harr, Ferrum vs. Emory & Henry, 10/31/98

Season: 40.9 avg - Richard Harr, Ferrum, 1998

Longest Punt
76 yds - Tom Vanik, Frostburg State vs. Montclair State, 9/17/05

Punt Returns
Game: 6 - many times

Season: 29 - Darrien Tucker, Methodist, 1998

Punt Return Yards
Game: 159 - Curtis Gore, Wesley vs. Husson, 10/25/03

Season: 513 - Curtis Gore, Wesley, 2003

Punt Return Average
Season: 18.3 yds/ret - Curtis Gore, Wesley, 2003

Longest Punt Return
95 yds - Curtis Gore, Wesley vs. Husson, 10/25/03

Kickoff Returns
Game: 6 - many times

Season: 33 - Albert Adderly, Methodist, 1999

Kickoff Return Yards
Game: 194 - Trae Hille, Apprentice School vs. Wesley, 10/12/01

Season: 845 - Byron Westbrook, Salisbury, 2005

Kickoff Return Average
Season: 39.2 yds/ret - Tony Hill, Salisbury State, 1998

Longest Kickoff Return
97 yds - Kodi Smith, Ferrum vs. Greensboro, 9/19/98
97 yds - Tony Hill, Salisbury State vs. William Paterson, 11/13/98

Team records
NOTE: ACFC records are incomplete. Various sources have been used to attempt to complete the records, including individual schools' websites.

Longest Winning Streak
13 games - Wesley (twice), 9/2/06 to 12/9/06, and 9/5/09 to 12/5/09

Longest Losing Streak
9 Games - Apprentice, 9/26/09 to 9/11/10

Scoring Offense
Game: 77 - Salisbury vs. Apprentice, 10/1/05

Season - Points: 581 - Wesley, 2005

Season Average: 44.5 ppg - Wesley, 2001

Scoring Defense
Game: 0 pts allowed, by many teams

Season: 7.7 ppg allowed - Ferrum, 2000

Pass Offense
Game: 476 - Wesley College vs. Rowan University, 9/8/01

Season: 336.9 yds/gm - Wesley College, 2001

Pass Defense
Game: 1 yd allowed - Wesley vs. Madison, 9/12/98

Season: 84.7 yds/gm - Ferrum, 2000

Rushing Offense
Game: 477 yds - Salisbury vs. Greensboro, 9/23/00
477 yds - Salisbury at Methodist, 9/21/02

Season: 330.4 yds/gm - Salisbury, 2005

Rushing Defense
Game: -41 yds - Wesley vs. Averett, 9/10/05

Season: 80.8 yds/gm allowed - Ferrum, 2000

Total Offense
Game: 643 yds - Wesley vs. Salisbury, 10/29/05

Season: 485.5 yds/gm (4855 yds) - Wesley, 2001

Total Defense
Game: -29 yds - Wesley vs. Madison, 9/12/98

Season: 165.5 yds allowed - Ferrum, 2000

3rd-Down Conversions
Season: .440 (84-191) - Wesley, 2005

4th-Down Conversions
Season: .842 (16-18) - Ferrum, 1999

Sacks For
Season: 39 - Wesley, 2005

Sacks Against
Season: 7 - Methodist, 2000

Field Goals
Season: .800 (12-15) - Wesley, 2006

PAT Kicking
Season: .931 (27-29) - Salisbury, 2001

Kickoff Returns
Game: 10 - Apprentice School vs. Salisbury, 10/1/05
Buffalo State vs. Salisbury, 10/15/05

Season: 25.6 yds/ret - Wesley, 1998

Punting Yards
Game: 467 - Ferrum vs. Emory & Henry, 10/31/98

Season: 39.1 yds/punt - Apprentice School, 2005

Turnover Margin
Season: 1.5 avg - Wesley, 2001

Punt Returns
Season: 18.7 yds/ret - Wesley, 2003

Pass Efficiency
Season: 154.93 rating - Wesley, 2001

Pass Efficiency Defense
Season: 64.46 rating - Ferrum, 2000

First Downs
Game: 35 - Wesley vs. Chowan, 11/3/01

Season: 285 - Wesley, 2005

Fewest First Downs Allowed
Game: 4 allowed - Ferrum vs. Averett, 9/2/00

Season: 89 - Ferrum, 2000

Penalties (fewest)
Season: 36 - Apprentice, 2003 (309 yds)

Yearly standings

Awards

References

External links